The following is a list of Major League Baseball players, retired or active. As of the end of the 2017 season, there have been 92 players with a last name that begins with Z who have been on a major league roster at some point.

Z

References

External links
List of Major League Baseball players at Baseball-Reference
List of Major League Baseball players (Zabala to Zwilling) at Baseball Almanac

 Z